The Chingstuel is a mountain of the Urner Alps, located on the border between the cantons of Obwalden and Bern. It lies between the Klein Melchtal and the region of Hasliberg.

References

External links
 Chingstuel on Hikr

Mountains of the Alps
Mountains of Obwalden
Mountains of Switzerland
Mountains of the canton of Bern
Bern–Obwalden border
Two-thousanders of Switzerland